The ricefishes are a family (Adrianichthyidae) of small ray-finned fish that are found in fresh and brackish waters from India to Japan and out into the Malay Archipelago, most notably Sulawesi (where the Lake Poso and Lore Lindu species are known as buntingi). The common name ricefish derives from the fact that some species are found in rice paddies. This family consists of about 37 species in two genera (some recognize a third, Xenopoecilus). Several species are rare and threatened, and some 2–4 may already be extinct.

Description

Most of these species are quite small, making them of interest for aquaria. They have a number of distinctive features, including an unusual structure to the jaw, and the presence of an additional bone in the tail.  
The Japanese rice fish (O. latipes), also known as the medaka, is a popular model organism used in research in developmental biology. This species has traveled into space, where they have the distinction of being the first vertebrate to mate and produce healthy young in space.

Genetic study of the family suggests that it originally evolved on Sulawesi and spread from there to the Asian mainland; the supposed genus Xenopoecilus are apparently unrelated, morphologically divergent species of Oryzias.

Taxonomy
The ricefish were formerly classified within the order Cyprinodontiformes but in the 1980s workers showed that they were a monophyletic grouping, mainly based on the characters on the bones of the gill arches and the hyoid apparatus, within the Beloniformes as the family Adrianichthyidae, this family making up one of the three suborders of the Beloniformes, the Adrianichthyoidei. Since then some workers have placed them in the Cyprinodontiformes but more recently molecular studies have supported their placement in the Beloniformes.

History
Ricefish are believed to have been kept as aquarium fishes since the 17th century. The Japanese ricefish was one of the first species to be kept and it has been bred into a golden color, from their original white coloring.

Reproduction
As with most fish, ricefish typically spawn their eggs, which are fertilised externally. However, some species, including the Japanese ricefish, are known to fertilise the eggs internally, carrying them inside the body as the embryo develops. The female then lays the eggs just before they hatch. Several other species carry their eggs attached to the body between their pelvic fins.

References

Sources

External links 
 FishBase info for Adrianichthyidae
 Genetic study of ricefishes

Adrianichthyidae
Beloniformes
Taxa named by Max Carl Wilhelm Weber